"Rocket" Raymond LeRoy Ramsey (July 18, 1921 – August 25, 2009) was an American multi-sport athlete. Following his college career at Bradley University, where he starred in basketball, football and track & field, he went on to play professionally in basketball and football. He was a defensive back for the Chicago Cardinals from 1950 to 1953 and remains the Cardinals all-time record holder for interception return yardage in a single season with 237 which he set in the 1953 season. He also played in the All-America Football Conference and in the Interprovincial Rugby Football Union, a forerunner of the Canadian Football League.

In addition, Ramsey had a brief professional basketball career, playing for the Tri-Cities Blackhawks in the National Basketball League and the Baltimore Bullets in the Basketball Association of America.

Statistics

Pro basketball statistics

Regular season

References

External links

Football statistics at The Football Database
Profile at Basketball Reference
Basketball statistics at StatsCrew.com

1921 births
2009 deaths
Accidental deaths from falls
Accidental deaths in Illinois
American football defensive backs
Baltimore Bullets (1944–1954) players
Basketball players from Illinois
Bradley Braves football players
Bradley Braves men's basketball players
Brooklyn Dodgers (AAFC) players
Chicago Hornets players
Chicago Cardinals players
Chicago Rockets players
Hamilton Tiger-Cats players
Sportspeople from Springfield, Illinois
Players of American football from Illinois
American men's basketball players